Japanese Surrendered Personnel (JSP) is a designation for captive Japanese soldiers (similar to Disarmed Enemy Forces and Surrendered Enemy Personnel). It was used in particular by the British Army to refer to Japanese forces in Asia which had surrendered after the conclusion of the Second World War.

Military and other labour 
The concept of "Japanese Surrendered Personnel" was developed by the Japanese Government and proposed to the Allies at the conclusion of the Second World War. Imperial Japan's field service code and strong social norms prohibited military personnel, including senior officers, from being taken prisoner. The Allies accepted this proposal, as it was also advantageous to them even though the status lacked a legal basis. JSP were not subject to the Prisoner of War Convention, and had no legal protections. The JSP were used until 1947 for labour purposes, such as road maintenance, recovering corpses for reburial, cleaning, preparing farmland, repairing bombed airfields, and maintaining law and order until the arrival of Allied forces to the region. Allied servicemen are known to have persecuted JSP through forced labour, without rest, in harsh conditions, forcing them to dispose of human waste, and by permitting them only animal feed and sometimes withholding meals.

After the war the United Kingdom quickly moved to regain control of its territories in Asia that had been captured by the Japanese, and also worked to ensure that the Dutch and French could regain control of their respective territories. Due to British manpower shortages post-1945, JSP were often pressed into combat service alongside British troops in Asia. Louis Mountbatten took on 35,000 Japanese troops into his command in Indonesia. Retaining their wartime organisation and led by Japanese officers they fought alongside the British, with one Japanese soldier even being recommended for the Distinguished Service Order as early as November 1945. The recommendation was given by General Philip Christison for Japanese battalion commander Major Kido. Other examples of action include the Japanese company led by Captain Yamada had been deployed to Magelang to assist the British forces stationed there; Japanese Kempeitai (military police) used to guard camps in Buitenzorg, Japanese artillery units used for offensives in Bandung, and the Bandoeng garrison that was reinforced by 1,500 armed Japanese. JSP troops saw action in Semarang, Ambarawa, and Magelang.

Being aware of the potential questions that would be raised if it was discovered that they were using the same troops they had just fought against as laborers and soldiers, the Allies worked successfully to conceal the extent of Japanese involvement in these post-war activities.

The retention of JSP by the British forces was carried out in spite of the repeated questioning of its validity by the American forces. The US made use of up to 80,000 Japanese prisoners of war in the Philippines for the duration of 1946, at one time even lowering the area priority for shipping and rerouting shipping to the British South East Asia Command to slow the rate of repatriation (while increasing the rate for prisoners held by the British).

JSP Operations in Vietnam 
Japanese Surrendered Personnel operated in the War in Vietnam of 1945–1946. They played a key role in supporting British, British Indian and French Imperial forces in what was the time French Indochina. The operation – Operation Masterdom as it was commonly known – was overwhelmingly successful and led to the restoration of French rule in Indochina. Casualties were estimated at at least 2,700 personnel dead for the Viet Minh and less than 100 total for the allied forces.

Relevant publications 

Several memoirs and other works relevant to the issue have been published. The most famous in Japan, which has been translated into English, is that by Aida Yuji, Prisoner of the British. A Japanese Soldier’s Experience in Burma.

See also 
 Japanese prisoners of war in World War II

References

Citations

Works consulted

Military history of Japan during World War II
Japanese prisoners of war
Japan–Myanmar relations